Snake Tales is a 2009 Australian children's television series produced by Westside Film & Television and distributed by Southern Star. The series, filmed in Victoria, consisted of thirteen episodes and premiered on the Nine Network on 5 September 2009.

Overview
The series revolves around a Snake Park located in the fictional suburb of Barren-Barren, the park is home to several residents, one of which is Tiger, daughter of the snake park owner Jake. Tiger is a twelve-year-old girl, who is matured well beyond her years and desires to move to the city. Her father is a not-so bright teacher, who runs the park and home school, known as the International Outback school. Tiger is joined by her brother J.J, siblings Skye and Harrison and their mother Miranda with international student Digby. Together they face the problems of living together and turning the snake park into a success.

Cast
 Peter Rowsthorn as Jake Johnson
 Cecelia Peters as Tiger Rose Johnson
 Danielle Horvat as Skye Sailendra
 Nicholas Fleming as Harrison Sailendra
 Leah Vandenberg as Miranda Sailendra
 Lucas Tang as Digby
 Liam Maguire as J.J. Johnson
 Ben Schumann as Goober

Notable Guests
Mark Mitchell
Marg Downey
Francis Greenslade
David Tredinnick
Jane Allsop
Todd MacDonald
Daniela Farinacci.

Episodes

Series 1

References

External links
 

Australian children's television series
Nine Network original programming
2009 Australian television series debuts
2009 Australian television series endings
Television series by Endemol Australia
Television shows set in Australia